Nadbišec (in older sources Nadvišec) is a settlement in the Municipality of Lenart in northeastern Slovenia. It lies in the  southwestern part of the Slovene Hills south of the valley of the Pesnica River. The area is part of the traditional region of Styria. It is now included in the Drava Statistical Region.

A small chapel in the settlement dedicated to Saint Joseph was built in 1923.

References

External links

Nadbišec on Geopedia

Populated places in the Municipality of Lenart